Inverness Airport  is an international airport situated at Dalcross,  north-east of the city of Inverness, Scotland. It is owned by Highlands and Islands Airports Limited (HIAL). The airport is the main gateway for travellers to Inverness and the North of Scotland with a range of scheduled services throughout the United Kingdom, and various scheduled services to Continental Europe. Charter and freight flights operate throughout the UK and Europe. Latest figures state 946,391 passengers passed through the airport in 2019. The airport is also headquarters to Dalcross Handling which now operates across Scotland.

History

Early years
The airfield was built by the Air Ministry in 1940 as Royal Air Force station Dalcross (RAF Dalcross), and was in use during the Second World War.

The following units were here at some point:

The airport was opened for civil operations in 1947. British European Airways, one of the predecessors of British Airways, commenced flights to London-Heathrow in the mid-1970s using a combination of Hawker Siddeley Trident jets and Vickers Viscounts. In the late 1970s and early 1980s there were two daily flights between Inverness and Heathrow; however, the route was discontinued in 1983 on the grounds of poor financial performance. Dan-Air inherited the service and offered a three-times daily service. The airline sustained the route adding links to London-Gatwick and Manchester in the late 1980s; however, these new services proved not to be successful and were discontinued.

When Dan Air was bought by British Airways in 1992, the flag carrier retained the service for a further five years, adding a fourth daily frequency shortly before withdrawing the link, amid considerable controversy and public anger, in autumn 1997. British Airways transferred the London service to Gatwick, operated by its subsidiary on a three-times daily basis using lower capacity BAe 146 regional jets. The emergence of EasyJet as a force in UK aviation coincided with the launch of a daily service to London-Luton in 1996. Other destinations and airlines were added including; (Belfast, Birmingham, Bristol, East Midlands, Leeds/Bradford, Liverpool, Manchester and Newcastle), particularly after 2003, where HIAL's marketing efforts were assisted by route development fund support from the Scottish Executive. The Heathrow link was reinstated at a daily frequency in 2004 by BMI; however, the service was discontinued in March 2008, the airline citing rising costs at Heathrow as the reason.

Since 1974, Inverness has been serviced weekly by non-commercial routes with Lorient (the 1st fishing port of France) in South Brittany. The companies Air Lorient, Diwan (Air Provence International) and Air Bretagne ensured the transport of sailors to the advanced bases in Scotland. Since 2005, Air ITM (Groupe Intermarché) has offered repatriation and replacement of sailors with a Hawker 400 jet aircraft.

Development since 2009

In 2004, Thomson Holidays launched a short series of peak season charter flights to Palma de Mallorca, Ibiza and Lanzarote using Spanair aircraft, flights to Palma were maintained (and Reus was added for a couple of seasons) through to 2010. Newmarket Holidays still operates various charters from Inverness on selected dates throughout the year. In June 2017 Thomson Holidays returned with peak seasonal flights to Palma once more, using a chartered Air Europa Boeing 737-800.

Ryanair cut its last routes to East Midlands and Liverpool in June 2009. Eastern Airways launched services to Manchester and Birmingham. However, when Flybe started flying the same routes in 2008, Eastern decided to withdraw.

International scheduled services proved difficult to successfully establish until the late 2000s, when a weekly seasonal service between Düsseldorf and Inverness commenced in summer 2009, operated by Lufthansa CityLine, and in 2011 when Flybe commenced daily operations to Amsterdam. The now-defunct Snowflake (a low-cost subsidiary of SAS) operated a twice-weekly service to Stockholm in the summer of 2004, however the service was withdrawn after a short period of operation, owing to lack of demand. KLM uk operated a daily service to Amsterdam via Edinburgh in 1997 but this was short-lived, lasting only a few months. ScotAirways launched a service to Amsterdam in 2001; however, this was withdrawn following the events of 11 September. A four-times-weekly service to Dublin was operated by Aer Arann between 2006 and 2008, before being withdrawn owing to escalating fuel prices.

The airport terminal is notable as an early example of the Public-private partnership favoured by the UK Government. HIAL was criticised for a PFI deal signed to build a new terminal at Inverness Airport. The deal signed by HIAL meant it had to pay £3.50 for every passenger flying from the airport to the PFI operator. In 2006, the PFI deal was cancelled, costing the Scottish Executive £27.5 million.

The airport is a hub on the Highlands and Islands network where flights between the islands, and other UK and European destinations connect. easyJet is currently the largest operator at Inverness, followed by Loganair.

The south apron, the main parking area for aircraft, was upgraded in May 2012 to improve access to the terminal by long-range aircraft. In November 2013 the airport's mile long runway was resurfaced and the taxiway extended, providing a link to the site of the Inverness Airport Business Park. However, the Business Park has struggled to become established.

On 3 May 2016, British Airways reinstated daily flights to Heathrow after an absence of 19 years. In the same month KLM Cityhopper launched daily flights to Amsterdam. Following the success of the route, it was increased to twice daily from March 2017. From March 2018, British Airways increased their flights to Heathrow from 7 to 10 weekly. Dalcross Handling, a local company, is the airline ground handler while Swissport operates the 'Aspire' business lounge in the Departure Lounge.

In anticipation of the greatly increased passenger capacity, HIAL announced a major expansion of the terminal building. This consisted of expansion of the departure lounge for additional seating and retail outlets, an extension containing a new international arrivals area, and an enlarged security search area.

On 13 November 2017, Loganair announced two new routes; a seasonal route to Norwich twice a week over the peak summer months, though this was scrapped three months before the planned launch. A new direct year-round service to Bergen was also announced. This service would operate 3 times weekly and would use the same BMI aircraft as the Manchester route, which allows same-plane service to Bergen for passengers from Manchester, along with the Inverness passengers.

In July 2018, HIAL announced that it was running an online poll to gauge public response to the idea of changing the airport's name to "Inverness Loch Ness Airport" to help boost tourism. However the public rejected the name change with 88% of those surveyed against it.

In 2021, HIAL released a master plan for development of the airport up to the year 2045.

Airlines and destinations

Passenger
The following airlines operate regular scheduled and charter services at Inverness Airport:

Cargo

Accidents and incidents 
The pilot was killed in the crash and the aircraft damaged beyond repair. The plane was scheduled to deliver  of mail to Edinburgh and took off at 20:55. Eyewitness accounts say a "dying orange glow" was seen in the area approximately 4 minutes after take-off. The AAIB report concludes that there was insufficient evidence to determine a cause to a reasonable amount of certainty.
On 19 January 2015, a Flybe Bombardier Dash 8 Q400 made an "uncontrollable slide" while the plane was exiting the runway. The AAIB investigation concluded that the incident was caused by a number of factors including the taxiway being wet with de-icing fluid, some patches of ice still existing on the tarmac and the plane having a "slightly higher than normal taxi speed". No one was injured and no damage was done to the aircraft.

Statistics 
Inverness Airport had 946,391 passengers in 2019, which was an increase of 4.8% from 2018. Gatwick Airport was again the most popular destination with 261,838 passengers. This route accounts for more than thirty percent of all passenger traffic at Inverness Airport, with all London routes combined accounting for under sixty percent of passenger traffic. Shown below are the top thirteen destinations in 2018.

Accommodation

Hotels 
A planning permission application was lodged for a 130-room development to be built at the Inverness Airport Business Park, near to the airport, that could provide hotel facilities. Construction commenced in January 2019, with the Courtyard by Marriott hotel finally opening in March 2020.

Ground transport

Bus 
Bus services operate between Inverness Airport, Inverness, Nairn and Elgin. Stagecoach in Inverness run between the airport and Inverness city centre close to the railway station. Jet bus offers a 24-hour service between Inverness Centre and the Airport, every 20 min at peak times and then at the hour off peak Monday – Saturday.

Rail 
Inverness Airport Railway Station on the Aberdeen-Inverness line opened on 2 February 2023 and serves the airport with a half-hourly bus connecting the two.

A new station at the airport was first approved in February 2017. In May 2021 Highland Council granted planning permission to Network Rail for a new two-platform station at the airport, but expressed reservations as a level crossing would be replaced with a bridge inaccessible to disabled people. One councillor, who noted the new bridge clashed with Transport Scotland guidance, described it as "low-quality infrastructure" and said it was "deeply shocking that we are getting infrastructure like that still [being] built."

In January 2023, it was announced the airport's railway station would open on 2 February 2023.

Road 

Access from the A96 was previously by a single track road (suitable only for smaller vehicles) or alternatively by the B9093 Ardersier road. When the airport installed the new instrument landing system, the single track road had to be closed altogether. In April 2006 a new road, Inverness Airport Way, was opened providing full access to all vehicles from the airport direct to the A96. However most 
traffic still uses the old Ardersier road as it is far quicker. The new road skirts the western perimeter of the airport in a large loop and is provided with 'wig-wag' signals if road traffic needs to be stopped during aircraft landing/take off.

Taxis are available directly in front of the terminal building.

Highland Aviation Museum
This museum was situated in the Dalcross Industrial Estate immediately adjacent to the airport. It had 3 full aircraft ( Hawker Hunter F.1 WT660 , Buccaneer S1 XK532 and Panavia Tornado GR1 ZA362 ) and several aircraft noses on display including Nimrod XV254 until , The museum was open to the public at weekends and bank holidays.

Future 
Highlands and Islands Airports have proposed the rebuilding of the terminal to accommodate a projected increase in passenger numbers to 1.8 million by 2045. The most expensive option, priced at between £34 and £55 million, would involve relocating the terminal buildings such that they are adjacent to the planned Dalcross railway station. An alternative proposal would see the existing terminal extended at a cost of £19 to £31 million. The Scottish Greens criticised the proposals, suggesting that the existing airport was adequate and that money should be invested in improving rail and bus links in the region instead.

References

External links 

 
 
 

Airports in Scotland
Highlands and Islands Airports
Transport in Inverness
Airports established in 1947